Stone Cold Metal is a rock compilation album that was released on August 25, 1998, by Mars Entertainment (known today as Spy Records).  Produced by Paul Tarnopol with the help of Stone Cold Steve Austin of the World Wrestling Federation, Stone Cold Metal was the first wrestling CD to ever chart on the “Billboard 200”, and according to Nielsen SoundScan, has sold more than a quarter of a million copies in the United States.  Up to that time, Stone Cold Metal had outsold all other wrestling CDs.

Stone Cold Metal utilized a lenticular CD case, which created a morphing effect between Steve Austin's face and his trademark human skull.   The album consisted of original hit recordings by Scorpions, Deep Purple, Accept, Dokken, Molly Hatchet, Ted Nugent, Dio, Rainbow, The Cult, Foghat, Def Leppard and Kiss.

Track listing

See also

Music in professional wrestling

References

1998 compilation albums
WWE albums